Escambia County Area Transit (ECAT) is the transit agency that serves the greater Pensacola, Escambia County, Florida area. It is owned by the Escambia County government which began managing the agency in 1971. ECAT served 1.23 million riders in October 2016 - September 2017.

List of Routes

Below is a complete listing of the 20 bus routes provided by ECAT. There are a total of 285 miles of routes and more than 1,000 stops. All routes operate daily except Sundays unless otherwise noted. Effective July 2017.

Fares 
The base cash fare for adults is $1.75. One free transfer is available upon request, but can't round-trip or stopover & good for next 120 minutes upon first boarding; transfers to commuter lines requires paying the difference in fares. ECAT offers passes for 24-Hour ($5.25), 1-Week ($14.50), and 30 days ($47). Certain routes carry a higher fare of $2.35 and are designated as "commuter" routes, typically providing service in peak commute directions on weekdays only. Discounted fares are available for passengers in certain demographics, such as seniors, person with disabilities, students (elementary through high school), and uniformed military personnel; no fare to up to 3 kids below  with fare-paying rider.

Fleet
The ECAT fleet is composed of buses manufactured by Gillig, ElDorado, and Champion. There are 32 buses in the fleet as of January 2016.

References

External links
 ECAT official site

Bus transportation in Florida
Pensacola, Florida
Transportation in Escambia County, Florida